Elwin Hugh Kennedy (April 22, 1892 – May 12, 1961), nicknamed "Spike" and "Spec", was an American Negro league outfielder in the 1910s.

A native of Bellevue, Kentucky, Kennedy played for the All Nations club in 1916. He also played minor league baseball through 1920 for such clubs as the Moline Plowboys and the San Francisco Seals. Kennedy died in Portland, Oregon in 1961 at age 69.

References

External links
Baseball statistics and player information from Baseball-Reference Black Baseball Stats and Seamheads

1892 births
1961 deaths
All Nations players
Baseball outfielders
Baseball players from Kentucky
People from Bellevue, Kentucky
20th-century African-American sportspeople